In complex analysis, the residue theorem, sometimes called Cauchy's residue theorem, is a powerful tool to evaluate line integrals of analytic functions over closed curves; it can often be used to compute real integrals and infinite series as well. It generalizes the Cauchy integral theorem and Cauchy's integral formula.  From a geometrical perspective, it can be seen as a special case of the generalized Stokes' theorem.

Statement
The statement is as follows:

Let  be a simply connected open subset of the complex plane containing a finite list of points , 
,

with the sum over those  inside .

The relationship of the residue theorem to Stokes' theorem is given by the Jordan curve theorem.

is well-defined and equal to zero.

In order to evaluate real integrals, the residue theorem is used in the following manner: the integrand is extended to the complex plane and its residues are computed (which is usually easy), and a part of the real axis is extended to a closed curve by attaching a half-circle in the upper or lower half-plane, forming a semicircle. The integral over this curve can then be computed using the residue theorem. Often, the half-circle part of the integral will tend towards zero as the radius of the half-circle grows, leaving only the real-axis part of the integral, the one we were originally interested in.

Examples

An integral along the real axis
The integral

arises in probability theory when calculating the characteristic function of the Cauchy distribution. It resists the techniques of elementary calculus but can be evaluated by expressing it as a limit of contour integrals.

Take  to be greater than 1, so that the imaginary unit  is enclosed within the curve. Now consider the contour integral

Since  is an entire function (having no singularities at any point in the complex plane), this function has singularities only where the denominator  is zero. Only one of those points is in the region bounded by this contour. Because  is

According to the residue theorem, then, we have

The contour  may be split into a straight part and a curved arc, so that

and thus

Using some estimations, we have

and

So,

Therefore,

If  then a similar argument with an arc  that winds around  rather than  shows that

and finally we have

An infinite sum
The fact that  has simple poles with residue 1 at each integer can be used to compute the sum

Consider, for example, . By the residue formula,

The left-hand side goes to zero as  since the integrand has order . On the other hand,

 where the Bernoulli number 

(In fact, .) We conclude:

which is a proof of the Basel problem.

The same trick can be used to establish the sum of the Eisenstein series:

The difficulty in this case is to show the vanishing of the contour integral at infinity. We have:

since the integrand is an even function and so the contributions from the contour in the left-half plane and the contour in the right cancel each other out. Thus,

See also
 Cauchy's integral formula
 Glasser's master theorem
 Jordan's lemma
 Methods of contour integration
 Morera's theorem
 Nachbin's theorem
 Residue at infinity
 Logarithmic form

Notes

References

External links
 
 Residue theorem in MathWorld

Theorems in complex analysis
Analytic functions